James Ford is an English record producer and songwriter, known for being a member of Simian Mobile Disco and The Last Shadow Puppets as well as his production work with the Arctic Monkeys, Foals, Florence and the Machine, Depeche Mode, Haim, Gorillaz, Klaxons, Jessie Ware, Kylie Minogue and the Pet Shop Boys.

Biography
Ford went to Manchester University, along with other members of Simian.

Ford was a founding member of the group Simian and later a member the spin-off duo Simian Mobile Disco.

He produced the Klaxons album Myths of the Near Future in 2007 which won the Mercury Prize. He also played drums on the album. Also that year, he produced the Arctic Monkeys second album. He has done at least part of the production on each of the band's subsequent albums.  He played guitar on Arctic Monkeys' "Only Ones Who Know".

In 2008, he formed the Last Shadow Puppets with Miles Kane and Alex Turner, as both drummer and producer. Their debut album, The Age of the Understatement, earned the group a Mercury Prize nomination and also charted at No. 1 in the UK. Their second album, Everything You've Come to Expect, was released in 2016. Ford once again produced, also playing drums, percussion and keys. The record earned the group their second UK No. 1.

Ford produced and played keys on Arctic Monkeys' fifth album, AM, released in 2013. His work on the album gained him a further Mercury Prize nomination.

Ford has produced the 14th Depeche Mode album Spirit released on 17 March 2017, as well as the fourth studio album of the UK band Everything Everything under the title A Fever Dream, released on 18 August 2017.

In 2018, Ford co-produced the Arctic Monkeys' 6th studio album Tranquility Base Hotel & Casino, as well as Gorillaz' 6th studio album The Now Now.

On 14 March 2023, it was announced he would be producing Pet Shop Boys' new album.

Discography 
See Discography: Simian & Simian Mobile Disco

Studio albums 
2023 - The Hum (Warp Records)

Production 
Fingathing – And the Big Red Nebula Band (co-producer; 2004)
Garden – Round & Round (2005)
Test Icicles – For Screening Purposes Only (2005)
Absentee – Schmotime (2006)
Duels – The Bright Lights and What I Should Have Learned (2006)
Mystery Jets – Making Dens (2006)
Arctic Monkeys – Favourite Worst Nightmare (co-produced with Mike Crossey; 2007)
The Bumblebeez – Prince Umberto & The Sister of Ill (2007)
Klaxons – Myths of the Near Future (2007)
The Lodger – Grown-Ups (2007)
The Last Shadow Puppets – The Age of the Understatement (2008)
Florence and the Machine – Lungs (4 tracks; co-produced with Paul Epworth, Charlie Hugall, Stephen Mackey and Eg White; 2009)
Peaches – I Feel Cream (2009)
Arctic Monkeys – Humbug (3 tracks; co-produced with Josh Homme; 2009)
Crocodiles – Sleep Forever (2010)
Detachments – Detachments (2010)
Chrome Hoof – Crush Depth (2010)
Alex Turner – Submarine EP (2011)
Beth Ditto – Beth Ditto EP (2011)
Arctic Monkeys – Suck It And See (2011)
Birdy – Birdy (2011)
Florence and the Machine – Ceremonials (2011)
Little Boots – Nocturnes (2013)
Bill Ryder-Jones – A Bad Wind Blows in My Heart (additional production; 2013)
Arctic Monkeys – AM (11 tracks; co-produced with Ross Orton; 2013)
Haim – Days Are Gone (2 tracks; co-produced with Ludwig Göransson, Haim and Ariel Rechtshaid; 2013)
Jessie Ware – Tough Love (2014)
Mumford & Sons – Wilder Mind (2015)
Damian Lazarus & The Ancient Moons – Message from the Other Side (2015)
Foals – What Went Down (2015)
Florence and the Machine – How Big, How Blue, How Beautiful (2015)
Bill Ryder-Jones – West Kirby County Primary (additional production; 2015)
The Last Shadow Puppets – Everything You've Come To Expect (2016)
Alexandra Savior – Belladonna of Sadness (co-produced with Alex Turner); (2017)
Depeche Mode – Spirit (2017)
Little Dragon – Season High (additional production; 2017)
Methyl Ethel – Everything Is Forgotten (co-produced with Jake Webb) (2017) 
Shock Machine – Shock Machine (2017)
Declan McKenna – What Do You Think About the Car? (2017)
Everything Everything – A Fever Dream (2017)
Arctic Monkeys – Tranquility Base Hotel & Casino (co-produced with Alex Turner; 2018)
Gorillaz – The Now Now (co-produced with Damon Albarn; 2018)
Matthew Dear – Bunny (1 track, co-produced with Jas Shaw; 2018)
Florence and the Machine – Moderation (non-album single, co-produced with Matthew Daniel Siskin; 2019)
Friendly Fires – Inflorescent (2 tracks, one co-produced with Mark Ralph; 2019)
Foals – Everything Not Saved Will Be Lost – Part 1 (additional production; 2019)
Foals – Everything Not Saved Will Be Lost – Part 2 (additional production; 2019)
Jessie Ware – What's Your Pleasure? (11 tracks out of 12; 4 co-produced; 2020)
Gorillaz – Song Machine, Season One: Strange Timez (3 tracks co-produced; 2020)
Shame – Drunk Tank Pink (2021)
Kylie Minogue – Disco: Guest List Edition (2021)
Birdy - Young Heart (4 tracks; 2021)
Arctic Monkeys – The Car (2022)
Depeche Mode - Memento Mori (2023)
Pet Shop Boys - untitled (2023)

References

Year of birth missing (living people)
Living people
English pop musicians
People from Leek, Staffordshire
English record producers
The Last Shadow Puppets members
Musicians from Staffordshire